Paula Rego, Secrets & Stories is a feature documentary produced by Kismet Films for the BBC which was first broadcast at 9 pm on BBC TWO Saturday 25 March 2017. It was released in Portuguese Cinemas on 6 April 2017 as "Paula Rego, Histórias & Segredos".

The documentary is an insight into the life and work of celebrated painter Paula Rego (1935 – 2022) directed by her son, the film maker Nick Willing. Notoriously private and guarded, Rego opens up for the first time, surprising her son with secrets and stories of her unique life battling fascism, a misogynistic art world and depression.

Born in Portugal, a country which her father told her was no good for women, Rego nevertheless used her powerful pictures as a weapon against the dictatorship before settling in London where she continued to target women's issues such as abortion rights. But above all, her paintings are a cryptic glimpse into an intimate world of personal tragedy, perverse fantasies and awkward truths. Nick Willing combines a huge archive of home movies and family photographs with interviews spanning 60 years and in-depth studies of Rego at work in her studio. What emerges is a powerful personal portrait of an artist whose legacy will survive the years, graphically illustrated in pastel, charcoal and oil paint.

Plot 

Dame Paula Rego was one of the greatest figurative artists of the post-war period. Her dark, complex works brought her international acclaim – with her own museum in Cascais near Lisbon, honorary doctorates from both Oxford and Cambridge universities, a damehood from the queen, countless books written about her work, and many ground-breaking exhibitions. Her work not only connects on a visceral level it has also been a powerful tool for social change.

In contrast to her bold and expressive paintings, Rego was notoriously private and evasive. Prior to the film she tended to talk about the 'surface stories' of her pictures and the technicalities of painting but rarely connected the work directly to her life. In this intimate film by her son, Rego laid bare the powerful forces behind her work and the experiences which infused her 'stories'. The result is a searingly honest and eye-opening profile of an artist and a mother. The emotional power of the film is heightened by the relationship between film maker and subject. It's a journey of discovery for Paula's son and the film captures moments of pure revelation. Yet the film also stands up as a comprehensive examination of her life and pictures.

Shortly after her eightieth birthday Rego started telling her son stories he'd never heard before, stories about her life that he felt gave him a unique insight into her work. So he asked her whether she'd make a film about her experiences, the struggles that turned her into one of our most important living artists, and to his surprise she agreed. In the film Rego painted a vivid picture of her childhood growing up in Portugal, a stifling and repressive society dominated by men where women were "encouraged to do absolutely nothing."

Rego started to draw at the age of four and soon discovered that in her pictures she could do anything, act out her fantasies, kill her bullies, do things, which as an intensely shy child, she felt unable to do in real life. She was encouraged by a father who introduced her to great storytellers such as Danté, Shakespeare, Verdi, and Walt Disney. Rego began to paint stories, finding ways of expressing complex ideas in a single visual image. Realising that his daughter had a unique talent, her father allowed her to go to the Slade School of Art in London. But the Slade taught a very stifling and academic method which Rego hated, so she hid at the back of the class and painted her own pictures. It was here that she met the painter Victor Willing, one of the school's biggest stars and soon fell in love despite the fact that he was married.

Life in London, alone, in her teens, a foreigner and woman competing in another male-dominated and often misogynistic environment was tough for the shy Rego. But perhaps as a reaction to her repressive upbringing she gave herself completely to Victor Willing. She became pregnant several times and knew that if she had a baby Victor would leave her and she would have to return to Portugal to lead a disgraced life as a single mother and never become an artist. Desperate, she sought a back-street abortion. This experience as a young 18-year-old profoundly affected her.

In 1998, when Portugal held a referendum to allow abortion, not enough people voted – not enough Portuguese women in particular – so the referendum was ruled null and void and abortion remained illegal. Rego was so incensed by the cowardice and hypocrisy of women that she was moved to paint a series of pictures of back-street abortions. These are among some of Rego's most powerful pictures – young schoolgirls recovering from makeshift operations by sometimes sadistic amateur abortionists. Rego recalled a cousin of hers who performed an abortion on his girlfriend and ended up killing her, so he dumped her in the sea and her bloated body was washed up on the beach. Everyone knew what had happened but no one did anything about it. "It was normal to treat women in this way", Paula says sadly.

Rego's abortion pictures were shown before the second referendum and, as President Jorge Sampaio explains, they made all the difference. This time women did vote, in droves, and abortion was legalised.

Returning to that difficult time in the 1950s, Rego told how, when she became pregnant again at 19, she decided that this time she would keep the baby, whatever the cost. Sure enough Victor told her that he was going back to his wife. Fearful that she would be treated badly, patronised and looked down on, Paula settled back in Portugal preparing herself for a life as an outcast.

To her surprise, Willing wrote to her father and told him that he missed her. He was invited to live in Portugal and they were given Paula's grandparents house in the fishing village of Ericeira to live in. Paula recalls this as one of the happiest periods in her life. They married and had two more children, and her work exploded with renewed vibrancy and power.

But Willing continued seeing other women, and fearful that he might leave again, Paula started doing the same. Infused throughout this period is Paula's sense of dread, awkwardness and fear – themes which continuously appear and reappear in her work.

In the film Rego confessed to having always suffered from depression. She recalled being afraid of everything as a child, a terror that continued. In 2006–7, when she was fighting a particularly bad spell of depression, she tried to 'draw her way out'. The result was 12 large pastels which she locked away, afraid that looking at them again might cause the depression to return. Nick asked his mother whether, now that 10 years had passed, she would show him on camera. She agreed and in a private moment of reflection Rego explains how the pictures illustrated her depression.

After the death of Rego's father in 1966, Willing took over his business, a specialist electronics factory. Despite being an artist with limited Portuguese and no experience of electrical engineering he mortgaged the family home to invest in the company. Rego reflected on how she should have stopped him, as this was followed by a brutal bankruptcy in which they lost everything.

To make matters worse, Victor was diagnosed with multiple sclerosis, a gradual paralysing disease. The family moved to London, – penniless – and Rego sunk into one of her most debilitating periods of depression. Her work 'went downhill' as Willing's illness got worse and their relationship suffered. But she kept at it, every day, working hard despite a uninterested art market.

The breakthrough didn't come until 1980 when Paula's work underwent a revolution. She started to use her personal life again, exploring her fantasies, fears and disappointments in her work, just as she had done as a child. These pictures – about Victor, her family, her lovers – drew the attention of art critics and dealers, and in 1986 Rego signed with Marlborough Fine Art, one of the world's leading modern art galleries. Ironically, her greatest success didn't come until Willing's death in 1988, a major retrospective in London's Serpentine Gallery, which cemented Rego as one of the most important women artists of her generation.

Looking back at this time, it feels almost as if Willing's death helped to release Rego's greater potential. She explored more complex and sophisticated themes, but even then, Willing remained at the heart of her work, in series such as the famous Dog Woman pictures in which she tried to come to terms with their difficult relationship, and The Crime of Father Amaro which brought back her formative experiences at the Slade. Feminist writers such as Germaine Greer and Marina Warner heralded Rego as artist who changed the role of women artists for ever.

Throughout, there is also a sense that Nick Willing is not only trying to rediscover Rego's life, better understand her pictures and tell her story, but also trying to get close to a mother who had often felt distant. For him the greatest revelation came at the end, when he asks her what is it that, after all she has achieved, she's most proud of.

Contributors 

Cas Willing Paula's Eldest Daughter
Victoria Willing Paula's younger Daughter
Ron Mueck Paula's Son-in-Law
John Erle-Drax Marlborough Fine Art
Fiona Bradley Author of 'Paula Rego' Tate Publishing
Luís Amorim de Sousa Poet and Friend
Lila Nunes Model and Assistant
Dame Marina Warner
Jorge Sampaio President of Portugal 1996–2006

Critical reception 
Reception in the UK and Portugal was enthusiastic across the board. On 25 March Sarah Hughes' wrote in The Observer: "This astonishing, intimate Film is both an astute appraisal of artist Paula Rego's work and a fascinating portrait of the relationship between the artist and her son Nick Willing, who directs" The Financial Times gave it 4 stars and Martin Hoyle wrote: "The result is frank, outspoken, moving, vigorously unregretful that begs for feature film treatment." Rachel Ward writes in The Times that "This Film by her son Nick Willing is quite an eye-opener and a vivid portrait of art as salvation." and Rachel Campbell-Johnston also writes in The Times that: "Rego talks with stark frankness and puckish laughter about everything". The Daily Telegraph's Lowenna Waters writes: " The film... involves some piercingly honest anecdotes from mother to son." In The Guardian, Juliet Rix wrote "This deeply intimate film ranges across the life and art of the Portuguese-born artist, whose work is bracketed with Lucian Freud, Frank Auerbach and David Hockney."

In Portugal, Time Out gave the film 4 Stars as did Sábado magazine

Awards 

On 4 November 2017 Nick Willing received the Grierson Award for Best Arts Documentary.
and in March 2018 the film won the Royal Television Award for Best Arts Program

References

External links 
 

BBC Television shows
2017 television films
2017 documentary films
British documentary films